Ilya Zalmanovich Baskin (born 11 August 1950), known professionally as Elya Baskin, is a Latvian-American character actor. He first gained attention for his role in Moscow on the Hudson (1984), as Robin Williams' character's best friend. He is also known for playing Peter Parker's landlord, Mr. Ditkovich, in Spider-Man 2 (2004) and Spider-Man 3 (2007).

Biography
Baskin was born to a Jewish family in Riga, Latvian SSR, Soviet Union, the son of Frieda and Zalman Baskin. He attended Moscow's prestigious Theatre and Variety Arts College and won a Festival of Young Actors Award at the Moscow Comedy Theatre.

He defected to the United States in 1976. He has built a considerable career in TV and film, and is often cast as Eastern European characters.

Filmography

Film

Telegram (Телеграмма) (1972) – teacher (uncredited)
Not a Word About Football (Ни слова о футболе) (1974) – music teacher
Three Days in Moscow (Три дня в Москве) (1974) – passerby
The World's Greatest Lover (1977) – Actor with Bad Breath
Butch and Sundance: The Early Days (1979) – Book-keeper
Being There (1979) – Karpatov
Raise the Titanic (1980) – Marganin
American Pop (1981) – Tuba Player
Moscow on the Hudson (1984) – Anatoly Cherkasov
2010 (1984) – Maxim Brailovsky
The Name of the Rose (1986) – Severinus
Streets of Gold (1986) – Klebanov
Combat High (1986) – Interpreter
Vice Versa (1988) – Professor  Kerschner
Zits (1988) – Vladimir Timoshenko
DeepStar Six (1989) – Dr. Burciaga
The Slice of Life (1989) – Foreign Man
Enemies: A Love Story (1989) – Yasha Kobik
The Pickle (1993) – Russian Cab Driver
Love Affair (1994) – Ship Captain
New York Skyride (1994)
Spy Hard (1996) – Professor Ukrinsky
Forest Warrior (1996) – Buster
Austin Powers: International Man of Mystery (1997) – General Borschevsky
Air Force One (1997) – Andrei Kolchak
October Sky (1999) – Ike Bykovsky
Running Red (1999) – Strelkin
Thirteen Days (2000) – Anatoly Dobrynin
Heartbreakers (2001) – Vladimir, Kremlin Waiter
50 Ways to Leave Your Lover (2004) – Dr. Stepniak
Spider-Man 2 (2004) – Mr. Ditkovich
Wheelmen (2005) – Vladimir
Confessions of a Pit Fighter (2005) – Nick
The Elder Son (2006) – Uncle Fedya
Color of the Cross (2006) – Caiphas
Spider-Man 3 (2007) – Mr. Ditkovich
The Dukes (2007) – Murph
Say It in Russian (2007) – Victor
God's Smile or The Odessa Story (2008) – Tad, a lawyer
Angels & Demons (2009) – Cardinal Petrov
Transformers: Dark of the Moon (2011) – Cosmonaut Dimitri
Jimmy P: Psychotherapy of a Plains Indian (2013) – Dr. Jokl
The Hive (2014) – Yuri Yegorov
Silent Screams (2015) – Andrei
Supervized (2019) - Brian
Reagan (2023) - B.E. Kertchman

Television

Big School-Break (Большая перемена) (1972) – student
MacGyver (1986–1987) – Yuri Demetri
Roseanne (1989) – Foreign Man
True Blue (1989–1990) – Yuri
Northern Exposure (1991) – Nikolai Appolanov
Quantum Leap (1991) – Major Yuri Kosenko
The Larry Sanders Show (1995) – Nicolae
Ellen (1996) – Sergei
Walker, Texas Ranger (1993–1996) – Corp. Yuri Petrovsky / Misha 
Mad About You (1996–1997) – Vladimir
Felicity (1999) – Bela
Becker (1999–2000) – Alexi
The Invisible Man (2001) – Dimitri Yevchenko
Deadly Force 2 (Убойная сила-2) (2001) – Makarov
The West Wing (2005) – Mr. Zubatov
Criminal Minds (2007) – Arseny Lysowsky
Heroes (2007) – Ivan Spector
Rizzoli and Isles (2012–2013) – Dr. Vladmir Papov
Castle (2014) – Sergei Vetotchkin
The San Pedro Beach Bums
MacGyver (2016) – Alexander Orlov
Madam Secretary (2017) – Dito Pirosmani
Homeland (2018) – Viktor Makarov, Russian ambassador

Video games

Command & Conquer: Yuri's Revenge (2001) - Additional voices
SOCOM II U.S. Navy SEALs (2003) - Additional Russia VOPrey (2017) - Yuri AndronovCall of Duty: Vanguard'' (2021) - Boris Petrov

References

External links
 

1950 births
Living people
Actors from Riga
American Ashkenazi Jews
20th-century American male actors
21st-century American male actors
American male film actors
American male television actors
Jewish American male actors
Latvian male film actors
Soviet emigrants to the United States
Latvian Jews
Latvian emigrants to the United States
American people of Latvian-Jewish descent
21st-century American Jews